Mount Suggs is a mountain with a bare rock northern face, standing 2 nautical miles (3.7 km) south of Mount Goodman in the Behrendt Mountains, Palmer Land. Mapped by United States Geological Survey (USGS) from surveys and U.S. Navy air photos, 1961–67. Named by Advisory Committee on Antarctic Names (US-ACAN) for Henry E. Suggs, equipment operator of U.S. Navy Mobile Construction Battalion One, who participated in the deployment to new Byrd Station, summer 1961–62.

Mountains of Palmer Land